"Oh Johnny, Oh Johnny, Oh!" is a popular American song composed by Abe Olman (1887–1984), lyricized by Ed Rose (pseudonym for Edward Smackels Jr.; 1875–1935), and published by Forster Music Publisher, Inc.  The music was copyrighted 7 February 1917 and the copyright was renewed 29 December 1944.  Under the Copyright Term Extension Act (1998), the sheet music is in the public domain, as is all music published in the U.S. prior to 1923.  Its melody and structure form the basis of a self-calling circle dance, using square dance steps and popular in summer camps.

Lyrics 

 Original lyrics, 1917, by Ed Rose

 1st verse (16 bars, E♭ Major)
 All the girls are crazy about a certain little lad,
 Al-tho he's very, very bad,
 He could be, oh, so good when he wanted to
 Bad or good he understood 'bout love and other things,
 For every girl in town followed him around,
 Just to hold his hand and sing:

 Chorus (32 bars)
 Oh, Johnny! Oh, Johnny!
 How you can love!
 Oh, Johnny! Oh, Johnny!
 Heavens above!
 You make my sad heart jump with joy,
 And when you're near I just
 Can't sit still a minute. I'm so,
 Oh, Johnny! Oh, Johnny!
 Please tell me dear.
 What makes me love you so?
 You're not handsome, it's true,
 But when I look at you,
 I just, Oh, Johnny!
 Oh, Johnny! Oh!

 2nd verse
 Johnny tried his best to hide from every girl he knew,
 But even this he couldn't do,
 For they would follow him most everywhere,
 Then his friends got him to spend a week or two at home
 It's worse now than before, 'cause the girl next door hollers thru the telephone:

 (chorus)

 World War I patriotic version, 1917, lyrics added by Raymond A. Sherwood

 Verse
 Uncle Sam is calling now for ev'ry mother's son
 To go get behind a gun and keep Old Glory waving on the sea
 Now prepare to be right there to help the cause along
 To every chap you meet when you're on the street
 You can sing this little song:

 Chorus
 Oh, Johnny, oh Johnny, why do you lag?
 Oh, Johnny, oh Johnny, run to your flag
 You're county's calling can't you hear?
 Don't stay behind while others do all the fighting, Start to
 Oh, Johnny! Oh, Johnny! Get right in line,
 And help to crush to foe.
 You're a big husky chap,
 Uncle Sam's in a scrap, You must!
 Go, Johnny! Go, Johnny! Go!

 Self-Calling circle dance version, date unknown 

 (To the chorus melody)
 Well, you all join hands as you circle the ring
 Stop where you are, give your honey a swing
 Swing that little gal behind you
 Swing your own, if you have time when you get home
 Allamain left with the corner gal
 Do-saw-do with your own
 Then you all promenade
 With the sweet corner maid
 Singing "Oh, Johnny! Oh, Johnny! Oh!"

Inspiration for the song 
According to an August 1945 United Press article, Ed Rose (lyricist) wrote the song when his friends, Mr. and Mrs. John Hansen of Akron, Ohio, began dating while attending college in Indiana.  They were so conspicuously in love that Rose, also their classmate, wrote the song about them and presented them with the original manuscript.

Notable recordings 
  Premier Quartet
 Blue Amberol Records, wax cylinder (1917) 

 The Andrews Sisters with the Vic Schoen Orchestra
 2840 Decca, 78 rpm; 10 inch (1939) 
 Recorded November 9, 1939, New York City
 Side A matrix 66498
 Audio sample

 Bonnie Baker with Orrin Tucker and His Orchestra
 Columbia, 78 rpm; 10 inch (1939)
 Recorded August 20, 1939, Los Angeles
 Side A — vocal version by Bonnie Baker
 Side B — instrumental version by Orin Tucker and His Orchestra
 Audio sample
 Pop hit on the Billboard Charts for 14 weeks, quickly became the top-selling record for the Columbia Recording Corporation, with 1.5 million records by the end of 1940

 Peggy Lee with orchestra conducted by Jack Marshall
 Album: I Like Men!
 Capitol Records, 33 1/3 rpm, 12 inch (April 1959)  stereo  mono
 Recorded 1959
 Audio sample

 Ella Fitzgerald and Her Famous Orchestra
 NBC broadcasts 
 Recorded January 25, 1940, at the Savoy, New York

Kathy Linden released a version of the song as a single in 1958 entitled "Oh Johnny, Oh!".

Filmography 
 Oh, Johnny, How You Can Love (1940 film), directed by Charles Lamont, Universal Pictures
 Spotlight Scandals (1943 musical film), directed by William Beaudine
 Starring Billy Gilbert, Bonnie Baker, Harry Langdon
 Swing Shift Cinderella (1945), directed by Tex Avery
 Sung as "Oh, Wolfy" by Red (voiced by Imogene Lynn) as Cinderella
 The Chronicles of Narnia: The Lion, the Witch and the Wardrobe (2005 film)
 During the scene when the children are playing hide and seek — when Lucy goes through the wardrobe

Original publications 
 Oh Johnny, Oh Johnny, Oh,

Sheet music (public domain) 
See sheet music collections:
 Indiana University Bloomington — IN Harmony: Sheet Music from Indiana
 University of Southern California — USC Music Library: Sheet Music Catalog

References 

1917 songs
1939 singles
1958 singles
Songs with music by Abe Olman
Kathy Linden songs
American patriotic songs